Pure Telecom Ireland is an Irish fixed telecommunications company. Established in 2002, the company is a leading provider of low cost broadband and phone services to residential and business customers.

The company's office is located in the Citywest Business Campus, Dublin 24. Pure Telecom 

Services offered by Pure Telecom include Fibre Broadband, Unlimited Broadband and Landline Connections.

History 
Pure Telecom was established by Paul Connell and Alan McGonnell in Ranelagh, Dublin, in 2002, with a focus on business customers. It moved to its first office in Citywest, Dublin, in 2005 to facilitate its growing staff base and plans to enter the residential telecommunications market.

Pure Telecom entered the residential market in 2005, offering competitive prices that reduced the cost of phone and broadband services in Ireland. In 2009, the success of its residential arm led to Pure Telecom's second office move to its current location in Citywest Business Campus.

In 2016, the company announced that the previous year was its most successful yet, having signed up 10,000 new residential customers in 2015, resulting in a €5 million revenue boost. The following year, the company announced that it had signed up its 40,000th residential customer after adding 10,000 new customers in 2016.

Services 

Fibre broadband
The company's fibre broadband packages can reach speeds of up to 150Mbit/s, 300Mbit/s and 1,000Mbit/s. It launched its 1,000Mbit/s ‘lightning’ broadband service in 2016.

Unlimited broadband
Some operators set monthly download limits and charge customers for any data usage that exceeds that limit. Pure Telecom provides customers with unlimited broadband usage.

Phone services
Customers can choose between phone and broadband bundles, or phone-only packages.

Business services
Pure Telecom offers voice, broadband and cloud services to businesses operating in Ireland. It also provides a fully managed installations service for start-up, relocating, greenfield or multi-site operations.

Rural Broadband 
Pure Telecom says that through deals with Ireland's wholesale providers, it is increasing its reach across Ireland – particularly in rural Ireland where broadband availability is low.

The company has signed a number of deals with leading telecommunications wholesale providers in Ireland. In 2017, it announced a €35 million deal with open eir, allowing it to offer almost two million potential customers high-speed broadband and phone services via open eir's nationwide open access network. Estimated at €20 million, it signed a deal with BT in 2018, allowing Pure Telecom to offer broadband and phone services to 1.8 million potential customers via BT Ireland's nationwide infrastructure network.

References

External links 
Twitter page

Telecommunications companies of the Republic of Ireland